George Frederick Wrighster III (born April 1, 1981) is a former American football tight end. He was drafted by the Jacksonville Jaguars in the fourth round of the 2003 NFL Draft. He played college football at Oregon. Wrighster has also been a member of the New York Giants.

Professional career

Wrighster was drafted by the Jacksonville Jaguars in the fourth round (104th overall) of the 2003 NFL Draft. He played six seasons with the team before being released on April 3, 2009. He often showed flashes of greatness, but missed 30 games due to injury. Wrighster was signed by the New York Giants on May 9, 2009 after attending the team's minicamp. He was waived on June 24, 2009.

After his professional football career ended, Wrighster entered the field of sports broadcasting. Beginning in September 2014, George hosted a Los Angeles-based daily afternoon radio show called "The Drive" on The Beast 980 KFWB. In August 2015, Wrighster debuted on Fox Sports 1 as a sports analyst and opinionist on such shows as "Fox Sports Live Countdown" and "Kickoff To Countdown.' He has also been the game analyst for multiple games on ESPN3 and FS1.

Wrighster launched the Unafraid Show, a website with sports content, in 2018.

Wrighster debuted on Mad Dog Sports Radio’s “NightCap” on SiriusXM on Tuesday December 8, 2020.

Personal life
Wrighster attended Sylmar High School in Los Angeles, California. He also attended The Buckley School in Sherman Oaks, California.

He appeared on the March 11, 2012, episode of Cupcake Wars on the Food Network representing Violet's Cakes in Pasadena, California.

On January 4, 2015, George married Danisha Danielle Hoston and currently resides in the San Fernando Valley with their blended family of four children: Devan, Damon, Payton, and Caden.

References

External links

Just Sports Stats biography

1981 births
Living people
American football tight ends
College football announcers
Jacksonville Jaguars players
Las Vegas Locomotives players
New York Giants players
Oregon Ducks football players
Players of American football from Memphis, Tennessee